''
This is a list of Oklahoma's state symbols, including official and unofficial. The official symbols are codified by statute. Many of the unofficial symbols are defined by Oklahoma Senate or House of Representative resolutions.

State symbols

See also
 List of U.S. state, district, and territorial insignia
 Oklahoma
 Outline of Oklahoma

References

State symbols
Oklahoma